Alexander Paterson (24 January 1844 – 23 March 1908) was an independent member of the Australian House of Representatives, representing the Division of Capricornia, Queensland.

Born in Greenock, Scotland, Paterson worked as a shipping manager before migrating to Australia in 1875.  In Australia, Paterson was involved in business ventures in Melbourne and Queensland, gaining enough stature in Queensland to be elected to the inaugural Australian parliament.

Paterson contested the seat of  Capricornia in the 1901 Federal election, winning by a margin of 139 votes over the ALP candidate Wallace Nelson.

On 15 June 1901, during the first parliament of the Commonwealth, the Immigration Restriction Bill 1901 was introduced, defined as A Bill for an Act to place certain restrictions on Immigration and to provide for the removal from the Commonwealth of Prohibited Immigrants.

The wording of the bill also listed in its definitions that restrictions "means any person who is unable to write out 50 words in a European language dictated by an officer".

Paterson spoke in favour of the bill, and in particular of the 'Chinese problem'. The bill was subsequently passed, and set in motion what is popularly known as the White Australia policy, which survived until late in the 20th century.

Paterson did not contest the subsequent election for health reasons, and retired from politics. He died at his home in Melbourne on 23 March 1908, after years of ill health. He was survived by his wife and five children.

References

Independent members of the Parliament of Australia
1844 births
1908 deaths
Scottish businesspeople in shipping
Members of the Australian House of Representatives
Members of the Australian House of Representatives for Capricornia
People from Greenock
Scottish emigrants to Australia
19th-century Australian politicians
20th-century Australian politicians
19th-century Scottish businesspeople